Joseph Jackson Manley (September 20, 1929 – November 25, 2014) was an American football center who played for the San Francisco 49ers. He played college football at Mississippi State University, having previously attended Hazelwood High School in Alabama.

References

1929 births
2014 deaths
American football centers
Mississippi State Bulldogs football players
San Francisco 49ers players
Players of American football from Alabama
People from Town Creek, Alabama
East Mississippi Lions football players